Tsargrad TV (Russian: Царьград ТВ) is a Russian television channel owned by Konstantin Malofeev. It was named after Tsargrad, the old Slavic name for Constantinople. He hired former Fox News producer John "Jack" Hanick to help him launch the channel. The channel started broadcasting in 2015. Aleksandr Dugin was named chief editor the same year. He has since been replaced by Elena Sharoykina. It is known for being conservative, mixing Russian Orthodox Christianity with Soviet nationalism, and supporting president Vladimir Putin.

In 2020, YouTube blocked its channel, citing U.S. sanctions against Malofeev.

In March 2022, Hanick was charged by the United States Department of Justice for violating U.S. sanctions in working with Malofeev.

References

External links

2015 establishments in Russia
Mass media companies of Russia
Russian-language television stations in Russia
Television channels and stations established in 2015
Conservative media